The hypostatic model of personality is a view asserting that humans present themselves in many different aspects or hypostases, depending on the internal and external realities they relate to, including different approaches to the study of personality. It is both a dimensional model and an aspect theory, in the sense of the concept of multiplicity. The model falls into the category of complex, biopsychosocial approaches to personality.

The term hypostasis can cover a wide range of personality-related entities usually known as type, stage, trait, system, approach. The history of the concept can be traced back to Peirce's hypostatic abstraction, or personification of traits. Different authors have described various dimensions of the self (or selves), personality dimensions and subpersonalities. Contemporary studies link different aspects of personality to specific biological, social, and environmental factors.

The work on subpersonalities was integrated into a hypostatic model. The model describes personality aspects and dimensions, as well as intra- and interpersonal relations. Not the person whole and alone, nor the relationship, but the relation between parts of person(s) is held as a central element that promotes both personal and social organization and disorganization. Personality is viewed as both an agency and a construction, along with its development and psychopathology, as the model is accompanied by specific methods of assessment and therapy, addressing each of the personality dimensions. The hypostatic relations of the human mind also imply the existence of a hypostatic model of consciousness, representing the contents of consciousness as an identity of various aspects, different only with respect to each other, but tending to coincide in a certain aspect of their consideration.

Overview

The hypostatic model of personality is a way of viewing the many sides of a person's character. The model states that a person can behave and appear to others in many ways, depending on how that person is, but also on how that person is viewed by the others (scientists included). It also states that people are not one-sided, but are a little bit of everything. For example, today someone can be mean, and tomorrow they can be good. How people are and present themselves at one moment or another also depends on their biological state, and the situation or environment (the people and things around them). For example, sometimes the most cowardly person may become the greatest hero, if they are called to save someone's life.

In order to be improved, all these "sides" of a person have first to be scientifically assessed.

Historical background

Origins and terminology

The concept of hypostasis as the shared existence of spiritual and corporal entities has been used in a number of religious and intellectual settings. The word hypostasis means underlying state or underlying substance, and is the fundamental reality that supports all else.

The Neoplatonic philosopher Plotinus writes about three hypostases: Soul, Intellect (nous) and the One.

The Christian view of the Trinity is often described as a view of one God existing in three distinct hypostases.

In the Kabbalah, the ten sephirot are the hypostases of God, capable of being known, as opposed to his absolute essence, which is inaccessible to knowledge.

Charles Sanders Peirce introduced the concept of hypostatic abstraction, which is a formal operation that takes an element of information, such as might be expressed in a proposition of the form "X is Y", and conceives its information to consist in the relation between a subject and another subject, such as expressed in a proposition of the form "X has Y-ness".

Hypostatic ethics has been described as the study of values in themselves, with all their relations, as agents and/or influencers of cognition and behavior.

In linguistics, Leonard Bloomfield introduced the concept of hypostasis to describe the personification of an object or state in sentences as I'm tired of your buts and ifs.

Aaron Rosanoff's theory of personality distinguishes seven dimensions (normal, hysteroid, manic, depressive, autistic, paranoid, and epileptoid), which can be epistatic or hypostatic dimensions, the manifestation of the latter being concealed or inhibited by the former.

Variants and evolution: selves and dimensions
In the philosophy of mind, double-aspect theory is the view that the mental and the physical are two aspects of the same substance.

In his Principles of Psychology, William James describes four aspects of the self:
material self (the body and the person's closest possessions and relatives, including the family);
social self (the being-for-others);
spiritual self (the person's inner and subjective being, her psychic faculties and dispositions, taken concretely);
the "pure" ego (the bare principle of personal unity).

Cognitive psychologist Ulric Neisser later described five "selves":
ecological self, as directly perceived with respect to the immediate physical environment;
interpersonal self, also directly perceived, established by specific emotional communication;
extended self, based on memory and anticipation;
private self (our private conscious experiences);
conceptual self, a system of socially-based assumptions and theories about human nature in general and ourselves in particular.

Carl Rogers distinguishes between the real self (the person as she is), and the ideal self (the person as the world told her she ought to be). Incongruence between these selves leads to feelings of anxiety.

Facet theory asserts that social-behavioral concepts are multivariate, and therefore they could be better described in terms of their "facets" and dimensions rather than as undifferentiated wholes; this can also be done using multidimensional scaling.

Hans Eysenck's three factor model of personality contains the independent dimensions of extraversion, neuroticism, and psychoticism; these different dimensions are caused by the properties of the brain, which themselves are the result of genetic factors.

The Minnesota Multiphasic Personality Inventory uses ten clinical scales measuring dimensions whose development and correlations in an individual determine her pathological tendencies.

The Big Five model describes five personality dimensions that affect the whole behavior, with each dimension having several facets.
The Diagnostic and Statistical Manual of Mental Disorders used an axial (dimensional) and categorical system of diagnosis. DSM-IV takes into account five dimensions: mental state, global personality, physical condition, environment, and global functioning of the person.

Towards a contemporary integration
Differentiation between various mental states and behavior patterns on the basis of their relation with brain and social environment became commonplace in contemporary psychology and sociology. 

On the biopsychological side, functional MRI studies have shown that different behavioral and mental activities involve specific patterns of brain activation, corresponding to psychological states. C. Robert Cloninger defines three independent dimensions of personality, which are related to heritable variation in patterns of response to specific types of environmental stimuli; variation in each dimension is strongly correlated with activity in a specific central monoaminergic pathway: 
novelty seeking, with frequent exploratory activity and intense excitement in response to novel stimuli, and with low basal dopaminergic activity;
harm avoidance, with intense responses to aversive stimuli and a tendency to learn to avoid punishment, novelty, and non-reward passively, and with high serotonergic activity;
reward dependence, with intense responses to reward and succorance and a tendency to learn to maintain rewarded behavior, and with low basal noradrenergic activity. These neurobiological dimensions interact to give rise to integrated patterns of differential responses to punishment, reward, and novelty.

On the social-environmental side, role theory defines the role as a set of connected behaviors, rights and obligations as conceptualized by actors in a social situation. Thus, roles can be:
cultural roles: roles given by culture (e.g. priest);
social differentiation: e.g. teacher, taxi driver;
situation-specific roles: e.g. eyewitness;
bio-sociological roles: e.g. as human in a natural system;
gender roles: as a man, woman, mother, father, etc.

Intersectionality is a methodology of studying "the relationships among multiple dimensions and modalities of social relationships and subject formations".

Roberto Assagioli uses the term "subpersonalities" for the social roles the person plays in different groups, roles that are mere "characters" played by the person, being different from her central inner Self.

As a core idea of his transactional analysis, Eric Berne asserts that there are at least three "persons" in each of us, calling them our "ego states": the Child (the emotional in us), the Adult (the rational in us), and the Parent (the authoritarian in us).

As functioning as a “society of mind”, the self is populated by a multiplicity of “self-positions” that have the possibility to entertain dialogical relationships with each other.

Internal Family Systems Model combines systems thinking with the view that mind is made up of relatively discrete subpersonalities each with its own viewpoint and qualities.

Description
At a metatheoretical level, the hypostatic model argues that persons have several kinds of aspects, including, but not limited to:
Adaptive aspects, pertaining to the internal organization of the person and the way she adapts to environment, including through actions and relations;
Constitutive aspects – the ways in which personality is constituted within its relations with the organism and the external world;
Temporal aspects, which represent the totality of forms that the person takes along the time line, short or long – including actions, states of consciousness, and developmental stages;
Referential aspects, which are the ways the person is perceived by herself or by the others (including personality scientists and theorists);
Integrative aspects – various combinations of the previous, which can be (or have been) the object of numerous research projects in psychology and related fields.

Organization of personality

Many schools of psychotherapy see subpersonalities as relatively enduring psychological structures or entities that influence how a person feels, perceives, behaves, and sees him- or herself.
According to the hypostatic model, human personality consists of four components or hypostases, which are patterns of behavior related to specific systems in the brain, and are conceptualized by virtually every culture as being characteristic and/or essential to humans:
the basic cognitive component – "Homo sapiens" (the intelligent person), which is in connection with sensory areas of the cerebral cortex;
the verbal subsystem – "Homo Loquens" (the speaking, communicating, and [self-]controlling person), which is connected with the activities of association areas;
the emotional and motivational subsystem – "Homo Potens" (the powerful and energetic person), which is correlated with the activity of the limbic system;
the pragmatic (motor) component – "Homo faber" (the productive and industrious person), which is linked to motor cortex activity.
One of these aspects can dominate the person, and lead to the development of – and adherence to – various philosophical views and schools:
Cognitive-intuitive aspect focuses on concrete, immediate data, which are not subject of any kind of selection – it originated philosophical empiricism;
Cognitive-intellectual aspect is only guided by reason; it leads to rationalism;
Verbal aspect is dominated by all that is meaningful – it leads to philosophical nominalism;
Emotional-hedonistic aspect views action as strictly limited to providing pleasure – it corresponds to philosophical hedonism;
Emotional-idealistic aspect is dominated by superior motives of contributing to the world in accepted ways – it leads to stoicism;
Pragmatic aspect values only things that facilitate practical action – it generates pragmatism.

Human behavior is generated through the interaction and coupling of these human aspects, creating personality dimensions.
The six behavioral, mental, and personality dimensions are: 
cognitive behavior, generated by cognitive and verbal aspects;
practical behavior, produced by verbal and motor components;
affective behavior, conducted by cognitive and motivational components;
expressive behavior, "co-worked" by motivational and motor components;
personality regulation, provided by verbal and motivational aspects, which form the regulative axis of personality;
general perceptual–motor adaptation, performed by the cognitive component together with the motor component, which form the adaptive axis of personality.

These dimensions correspond to the following types of mental operations:
cognitive operations – production and verbalization of images and thoughts;
practical operations, pertaining to executive functions;
affective operations – affective evaluation of the world and self;
expressive operations (emotional expression);
regulative operations – verbalization of needs, motives and feelings, and self-control;
perceptual–motor adaptive operations (e.g., eye–hand coordination).

In every specific task of daily life, one of the first four dimensions (cognitive, practical, affective, or expressive) is dominant, being at the center of the experience, whereas the other three are subordinated to it. Regulative and adaptive dimensions are constantly acting as a background throughout the behavioral process. 

The six personality dimensions are described as follows:

 Consciousness is the level of mental (cognitive) development;
 Strength is the overall capacity of the person to change or influence her surroundings, which is distinct from the vital or mental energy that she expresses;
 Values are what is most important or valuable to a person, and they imply evaluating what is good vs. what is bad;
 Energy is a subjective measure of the strength or intensity of personality (the vital or mental energy that it expresses through behavior);
 Direction refers to the person's attitudes, motives, and intentions that regulate her behavior;
 Depth refers to the levels of complexity of behavior, ranging from simple reactions to complex adaptive patterns.

This is a composite view in which the six dimensions combine in complex ways to form "the web and woof of human personality". Within this view, the concrete, developing person may be represented as a point or a small three-dimensional object. Her trajectory for growth is to expand from that point in multiple dimensions to become a sphere, developing her four specific dimensions of knowledge, capacity, power, and enjoyment.

Personality as an agency and as a construction

In addition to this "doing" dimension of personality, there is also a "being made" dimension, including the constitutive axes – each one formed of a mental content (which can be cognitive, verbal, motivational, or pragmatic, depending on the personality aspect), a mental and behavioral activity related to it (which can be cognitive, practical, affective, expressive, regulative, or adaptive), and their brain and environmental correlates, respectively. 
Each constitutive axis consists of two couples: one formed by a brain factor and the corresponding behavior, shaping a mental (memory) content and structuring a "trait" or recurrent behavior, and the other one formed by that mental content and its environmental correlate, generating the specific behavior (functioning). 
For example, assertive behavior is determined by environmental factors and assertiveness, whereas assertiveness itself is the product of both brain predisposition and assertive behavior. An obsessive-compulsive individual maintains his obsessions (content) if often left alone with his predisposing brain and ritualistic behaviors. A shy person (trait) displays less shy behavior when in a familiar environment. This model provides a picture of the emergent relations between personality structuring, mental functioning (behavior), environment, and biology.

Cognitive and affective "paths": brain imaging data

Research using functional magnetic resonance imaging of the brain suggests that cognitive and affective-expressive forms of communication and self-reflection have distinct neural bases. Clinical findings have long suggested that verbalizations are often very incoherent when the individual is trying to put into words something deeply emotional. Identification of words naming emotions (happy, neutral, sad) was found to be faster than identification of corresponding facial expressions. Recognition of face expressions was more difficult to suppress in favor of the recognition of words than vice versa, the two conditions presenting different patterns of brain activation. These experimental results suggest that reading and recognition of face expressions are stimulus-dependent and perhaps hierarchical behaviors, hence recruiting distinct regions of the medial prefrontal cortex.

Research indicates that the representations of faces and objects in ventral temporal cortex are widely distributed and overlapping, face stimuli eliciting response patterns distinct from those elicited by object stimuli.

The phenomena that have been characterized clinically as “unconscious communication” may be defined systematically as emotional communication, which occurs both within and outside of awareness.

Research suggested that the fundamental mechanism at the basis of the experiential understanding of others’ actions is the activation of the mirror neuron system. A similar mechanism, but involving the activation of viscero-motor centers, underlies the experiential understanding of the emotions of others.

Activation of mirror neurons in a task relying on empathic abilities without explicit task-related motor components supports the view that mirror neurons are not only involved in motor cognition but also in emotional interpersonal cognition.

Evidence suggests that there are at least two large-scale neural networks: frontoparietal mirror-neuron areas related to perceptual-motor interactions with others, and cortical midline structures that engage in processing information about the self and others in cognitive and evaluative terms.

Relations

According to the model, intrapersonal relations can be:
 direct (adjusted) relations (cognitive decision followed by practical action: "I decided that's better for me to leave my boyfriend, and I told him that", or affective decision followed by expressive action: "I love my girlfriend, so I'm always gentle with her");
 crossed (unadjusted) relations (cognitive decision followed by expressive action: "Today I decided that it's better for me to break up with my girlfriend, and I'll behave so that she will leave me", or affective decision followed by practical action: "We love each other; that's why we are moving in together").

Interpersonal relations can also be:
 direct (cognitive reaction to another person's practical action: "My girlfriend wants to make up with me, and I agree, because that's better for both of us", or affective reaction to the other's expressive action: "She loves me, I can feel it in her eyes");
 crossed (affective reaction to other's practical action: "My partner wants to buy me a house, and therefore I assume he/she loves me", or cognitive reaction to an expressive action of another person: "He is giving me a bitter look, and I'm wondering what is wrong?").
The locus of a relational disorder "is on the relationship rather than on any one individual in the relationship."

The self
The self is the self-reflective dimension of mental life, which has long been considered as the central element and support of any experience, as the notion of "subject of experience" suggests. There is only one "me", but she is not always center stage. Sometimes people are so focused on a task that they forget themselves altogether. The self is in fact at the center of the experience only during self-evaluation. In cognitive, affective, practical, and expressive tasks, consistency of specific operations involved in accomplishing the tasks was found to be significantly higher than consistency of the results of self-assessment involved in the same tasks.

Standard ways to tackle the self by considering self-evaluation do not target the self in its specificity. Instead, what is specific to the self is the subjective perspective, which is not intrinsically self-evaluative but rather relates any represented object to the representing subject.

Unconscious phenomena
 
As adaptive and regulative axes of personality provide integration of consciousness and personality, certain unconscious phenomena may result from the incomplete integration of one of these axes. For example, in subliminal perception, the adaptive, perceptual-motor axis is not properly integrated with other mental operations, and in dissociative disorders, the regulative axis is the one affected. If one of the axes does not function properly, both consciousness and performance in specific tasks are impaired.

Intelligence and personality
Intelligence and personality are often seen as fundamentally different, a fact which ignores both the performance aspect of personality, and intelligence-related traits. Thus, cognitive and emotional instruments are artificially separated from their energetic and value contents. The concept of dimensional capacity is therefore proposed as a binder of behavioral performance and content.

Biological and social adaptation

The hypostatic model suggests that human behavior is usually the result of the random interference of two separate behavior systems: the "animal" system (biological adaptation) and the "human" system (social adaptation), both having the same biological underpinnings and partially sharing the same behavioral repertoire with different effects, not directly related. For example, while homosexual behavior does not have biological (reproductive) effect, it has social adaptive value in cultures that permit it or, as in ancient Greece, require it. Also, heterosexual behavior can have reproductive effect, but has no social adaptive value in monks or nuns. Cosmetic surgery has no biological value, but can be highly valued by society, while taking sleeping medication may have a biologically adaptive effect, but may not be socially adaptive in ascetic cultures. People can eat because they are hungry (biological adaptation), or because they like good food or want to enjoy the company of others (social adaptation). They can have sex to fulfill their sexual and reproductive needs (biological adaptation), or to fulfill their love, have children to bear their name, or simply have a good time together (social adaptation). People can use the same instinctual or learned behavior to different adaptive purposes, biological or social.

In critical situations, biological and social fields of adaptation converge, forming an integrated, bio-social adaptation system: confronted with new and spreading disease and risk factors, modern medicine made people live longer, healthier, more productive lives, and that, in turn, set the ground for further progress of civilization. Nobel laureate Ralph M. Steinman prolonged his life with the help of his own scientific discoveries, and this allowed him to continue research in cancer immunotherapy.

Preliminary experiments needing extensive verification
have suggested that in well-rested subjects, engaging in "biological" behavior (eating, sex) does not lead to lowering of mental energy levels, as measured with a self-assessment scale, and engaging in "psychosocial" behavior (cognitive tasks) does not lead to lowering of physical energy levels (measured with a similar scale). However, in subjects with exhaustion both results were positive (feeding-related and sexual activities lowered both physical and mental energy levels, and engaging in cognitive tasks did the same). These results have been interpreted as an indication that biological and social systems of adaptation are energetically independent in "normal" conditions, and become energetically integrated (create a common pool of energy) in exhausting, "heavy duty" situations.

Decision making and free will

Subjects who had the possibility to choose freely between performing different cognitive, practical, affective, and expressive tasks reported that they chose each task because they either a) felt the need to do it, b) considered this was the task they could perform most efficiently in given circumstances, or c) for both previous reasons.
Not one of the three reasons above was statistically prevalent. This research suggested that human freedom can be scientifically interpreted in terms of an internal selection of environmental stimuli and internal variables, a selection which has a randomly variable, cognitive or affective locus. 
People with transient mental disorders, as well as people without disorders acted according to a probabilistic model, whereas those with chronic disorders showed a more deterministic pattern of behavior.

Personality development
Development pertains to long term change versus stability of personality. According to the hypostatic view, the actual development of a person is the result of the opposition between stimulating and inhibiting factors of development, factors that are biological and environmental in nature. If stimulating factors are dominant, then developmental progress results (new acquisitions are made); if inhibiting factors are dominant, then the result is developmental regression (acquisitions are lost). If the two kind of factors are of relatively equal force, development is stagnant. Development can be accelerated, decelerated, or of uniform speed, depending on the dynamics of the relation between stimulating and inhibiting factors.

Childhood and adolescence
Some of the characteristics of personality development during childhood and adolescence are summarized in the table below.

Adulthood
During adulthood, the person is usually capable of creation and self-determination, and development can follow paths such as these:
Evolutive–constructive–self-determined, which is characteristic to the free person who changes herself and the world she lives in according to her own projects;
Stagnant–constructive–self-determined – the person who sacrifices her own evolution in order to invest her entire creative freedom in transforming the world (the "selfless creators");
Evolutive–reactive–self-determined – the person who uses her freedom mainly to determine her own evolution (personal achievement);
Evolutive–reactive–determined – the person affected by compelling biological factors or environmental events, positive or negative, that restrain her freedom (e.g. disease, war, winning the big pot);
Stagnant–reactive–determined is the submissive, responsive, and complying person who lives in a non-stimulating environment (a "dull" existence).

Psychopathology

The unusual, the unnatural, and the counter-cultural in the area of mental life have been – in all ages – "subject of astonishment and reflection for individual reason, object of exclusion and confinement for social action", being met with "reserve or even repulsion by the public and with interest and even fascination by thinkers". In all cultures, aspects of internal disorganization and adaptive inefficiency of the person have generally been considered abnormal, whether they were referenced as "demonic possession", "madness", "mental illness", or "deviance" by different societies and theories. People displaying an efficient disorganization of personality and behavior do their job in spite of the fact that they are not well organized, and are generally described as "strange" by others, while those presenting an inefficient organization are not successful in what they do, although their behavior is consistent; they have a high rate of failure, caused by a low level of acquisitions and/or functioning.

Efficient adaptive patterns are those in which specific adaptive behavior is displayed only in situations that require it ("activating situations"), whereas inefficient adaptive patterns are those in which adaptive behavior is inappropriate in the given situation. Inefficient adaptive patterns can be hyperadaptive, when adaptive operations are active in both activating and non-activating situations (as in mania), or hypoadaptive, when adaptive operations remain inactive in both types of situations (as in depression).

People tend to neglect stimuli with low cognitive or affective significance to them, as well as forget excessively intense emotions and information that is too difficult for them to understand.
Experiments performed on individuals which were given cognitive and affective (evaluative) tasks much above their current levels of cognitive and emotional competence led to difficulties in remembering the difficult tasks, associated with lowering of performance in previously mastered tasks.
Improving performance in simple, repetitive tasks in anxious patients improves memory of failed tasks as anxiety symptoms decrease.

Broader applications
The model of personality components and axes was extended to familial-organizational and societal levels.<ref name=crich>Crichton, A. "Personality Manipulation and Change Throughout Life" . The Philosopher's Zone.</ref> The model was also applied to the study of the historical evolution of human civilization in the process of globalization, as well as in the analysis of literary characters seen as novel creations "in humans' image" and part of the "neoverse" – the universe created by the author of a literary work.

Methods

Methodological parameters
The hypostatic model uses several qualitative parameters for the assessment of personality investigation and intervention; these parameters can be applied to any scientific endeavor.

Parameters of investigation assessment

Experimental productivity is the difference between the system of hypotheses and the system of experimental data resulting from the research; it measures the efficiency and precision of scientific prediction – a greater difference means a lower predictability of the experiment.
Experimental progress is the difference between the hypothetical structure of the research and the structure of its conclusions ("theses"); it represents the contribution to knowledge of that particular research project. A greater difference between hypotheses and conclusions means more new ideas suggested by the experimental outcome, thus a greater progress.

Parameters of intervention assessment

Intervention amplitude is the difference between the current state of the person and her state projected as the outcome of the intervention – the "ambition" of the intervention;
Intervention efficacy is the ratio of goal structure to outcome structure of the intervention;
Interventional effect (transformation or change) is the difference between the person before and after intervention – it indicates the degree of modification of personality induced by the mental health professional or educator.

Nearest-neighbor comparison
Nearest-neighbor comparison of two persons in a sample involves comparing a person A with the person B who has the closest match to A on one or more given criteria. It is also called the method of hypostatic definition, because of "defining" a person through her genus (in this case the nearest neighbor) by outlining her differentia. By comparing two very similar persons and trying to detect the differences between them, the researcher obtains a deeper knowledge of both persons.

The steps of the technique are:
finding the nearest neighbor B of the person A;
comparing the two persons (A and B) and finding as many differences as possible based on the methods used in data gathering;
rebuilding a richer picture of each person (A and B), based on the differences that have been identified. For example, person B is almost as aggressive as person A (nearest neighbor). Through comparison it is found that while A is most aggressive at home, B is most aggressive at work (difference). Comprehensive data about concrete aspects of human personality gathered from many individuals all over the world can be digitized and stored in a "hypostatic library" with practically limitless growing potential, given the current developments in computing technology; data in this library could be used as reference in further research and practice.

Setting the goals for personality change
In this kind of humanistic "psychological engineering", setting the goals for personality change is completely non-normative and non-judgemental. There is nothing wrong that must be remedied, no disease to cure, but an end state to be reached, like in the following goal formulations by the subjects and/or their families: 
"I want to be in a certain way, planned by me";
"I want to be like I was before";
"I want to be like other people";
"I want to be the way that others want me to be";
"I want to be different from how I am today".

Summary of methods

The model uses the following methods of assessment and intervention:
 biological and ecological assessment through methods of dynamic analysis of development, investigating the complex interplay of stimulating and inhibiting factors of development and their effects on developmental speed (acceleration or deceleration), with prognostic implications;
 cognitive and affective techniques (method of prints of consciousness, based on self-coverage and self-report; human liberty test, using free-choice activities in order to study probability in an individual's behavior);
 practical techniques (method of operational chains, a form of mental chronometry that ensured the identification of mental operations and allows the assessment of their speed and functionality);
 regulative techniques (task boosting techniques);
 perceptual-motor adaptation techniques (test of adaptive reactivity; method of adaptive therapy, based on non-specific perceptual-motor learning);
 psychopharmacological techniques, using drugs that act specifically on different constitutive axes of personality (cognitive, practical, affective, expressive);
 psycho-molecular method, influencing the activity of specific neurotransmitter systems through specific psychological tasks; the method is part of psycho-molecular medicine, which integrates details of molecular structure into upper, psychosocial levels of the human organism.
 relational techniques, which aim to "set the things straight" by assessing relations and replacing crossed (indirect) relations with direct (straight) relations.

Psycho-molecular therapy
The psycho-molecular method uses specific tasks in order to influence specific neurotransmitter systems. 
Through the control of the environment which is selectively enriched or deprived, some of the subject's brain areas can be stimulated or inhibited systematically, leading to changes in the seric levels of the metabolites of certain neurotransmitters, associated with clinical improvement in burnout individuals. Behavioral approaches have a critical impact on molecular patterns of autoregulation, leading to the assumption of a bio-psycho-socio-molecular model of autoregulation, including stress and pain. Thus, molecules and behavior may be seen as two sides of the same problem in pain and stress relief. 
 
Psycho-molecular techniques can be stimulating or inhibiting. Stimulating techniques involve the presence of environmental materials that allow a single type of activity (cognitive, practical, affective, or expressive). For example, the subject sits in a room where he has nothing else to do except read. Inhibiting techniques selectively exclude from the subject's environment materials that allow one specific type of activity, leaving all the other types available (for example, the subject can look at paintings, watch sports on TV, prepare his food, but has no books or other learning material in his room).

Stimulating techniques are: 
Practical technique, that involves living at a farm where the sole activity is food foraging and preparation;
Expressive technique, that involves relational experiences in a room where the subject lives together with another person;
Cognitive technique, that puts the subject in a room where books and other learning material are the only object of activity;
Affective technique, that involves placing the subject in a room where there are only art works and audio and video hardware for listening music and watching movies.

Inhibiting techniques are: 
Cognitive technique, that excludes from the environment textbooks and other objects of cognitive behavior;
Affective technique, that excludes sources of affective and aesthetic evaluation;
Practical technique, that excludes home appliances, cleaning activities, preparing food, and setting the table;
Expressive technique, that places the subject in a room with all facilities, but where interactions with other persons are reduced at a minimum.

The control of the effects of these techniques is made through clinical scales and biochemical tests monitoring serum levels of metabolites of several stimulating and inhibiting neurotransmitters: dopamine (homovanillic acid), norepinephrine (3-methoxy-4-hydroxyphenylglycol), and serotonin (5-hydroxyindoleacetic acid). 
Although less spectacular than with psychopharmacological methods, the effect of psycho-molecular therapy is more complex and natural, and needs to be associated with psychopharmacological and psychotherapeutic treatments.

Relational therapy
Relational (or direct relations) therapy (RT) is a method of psychotherapy aimed at changing the relations between the four dimensions of doing – thinking, acting, feeling, and expressing, both within the person and in her relationships.Ostaciuc, Vasile (2002). "Codrin Stefan Tapu: Psihologie operatorie" (book review), Journal of Psychology. Romanian Academy, 1-2, 148-149

Goals
The main goal of RT is improving client's communication and relationships through:

1. Replacing crossed intrapersonal relations with direct intrapersonal relations; instead of expressing what she thinks or acting out what she feels, the client should act the way she thinks and express what she feels. Characterological self-blame (through attributing affective and personal, relatively nonmodifiable sources to own actions) has been proved to be more depressogenic than behavioral self-blame (through attributing cognitive and impersonal, controllable sources to actions). For example, female victims of rape who said to themselves 'It was me, it was something I've done that provoked this' were more depressed than those who said 'The fact that I was walking through that part of the town caused the attack'.

2. Replacing crossed interpersonal relations with direct interpersonal relations; instead of feeling about others' acts or thinking about what others express, the client should think about others' acts and feel what others express. Many problems originate in acting to please or hurt others, and in being pleased or hurt by others' actions.

Indications

The indications of RT consist of all kinds of relational problems that may arise in dating, family and work relationships, casual social encounters, as well as anxiety, depression, and other mental problems. In the case of problems in stable relationships, both partners should be assessed and participate in sessions, if needed.

Client-therapist relationship

During therapy sessions, client and therapist promote direct relations between each other. For this they are required:
 to let their feelings for each other be expressed through their body language;
 to avoid verbalizing what they feel about each other;
 to freely and boldly verbalize what they think about one another;
 not to let their body language be the mean of communication of thoughts they do not dare utter;
 to try to feel each other's emotions as they are expressed through their body language;
 not to be emotionally moved by each other's actions, as in taking things personally;
 to reflect about the actions of each other;
 not to try to discover some meaning in each other's body language.

Relational therapy is in accord with other psychotherapeutic approaches in understanding the nature of human relationships and the therapeutic mechanisms: many forms of psychotherapy, such as psychoanalysis, person-centered therapy, and cognitive therapy, aim ultimately to create direct relations between thoughts and actions, and between feelings and expressions, so as the client's thoughts really get in touch with her feelings, and her expressions really support her actions.
 

Initial assessment

The initial assessment in RT has two main objectives:
 to establish what is the main problem that led the client to therapy;
 to identify crossed relations within the person, and between her and others.

Therapy sessions and techniques

A typical session of RT involves the following steps:

1. The client presents her crossed relations, as they occurred since the last session;

2. The therapist asks the client how she thinks the correct relation should sound like, and tells her that, if she could not say;

3. The therapist, along with the client, tries to identify crossed intrapersonal relations in people with whom the client interacts;

4. The therapist asks the client about what she thinks she could do to counteract those crossed relations, in order to improve communication relationships with those people, and makes suggestions to her, if she has no ideas.

Outcome assessment
A final assessment through interview and questionnaire is made, to see:

1. If there are residual crossed relations in the client's life;

2. If she is able to prevent new crossed relations to occur;

3. If she is able to counteract crossed relations in others with whom she interacts, in order to maintain good communication relationships with those people;

4. To what extent the initial problems for which she addressed the therapist have been solved.

Treating typical problems
Interpersonal problems: relationship management

Problem definition: I decided that's better for me to leave my boyfriend, and I tried to show him that (expressing thoughts through behavior).

Problem solution: I decided that's better for me to leave my boyfriend, and I told him that (actively and explicitly communicating thoughts).

Problem definition: My girlfriend wants to make up with me, and I'm thrilled about that, because that means that she loves me (feeling about the other's intended actions).

Problem solution: My girlfriend wants to make up with me, and I think that's better for both of us (thinking about the other's intended actions).

Problem definition: I love my girlfriend, and I always make her gifts (acting out feelings).

Problem solution: I love my girlfriend, and I'm always gentle with her (expressing feelings).

Problem definition: I can see in her eyes that she thinks I'm smart (thinking about other's expressions as indicating supposed thoughts).

Problem solution: I can see in her eyes that she likes me (feeling other's expressions).

An intrapersonal problem: fear of going to college

First, client and therapist identify crossed intrapersonal relations, through the following scenario:

 I plan to go to college [thought], but I can't do it [expression]. Thoughts not acted out give rise to pathological expressions (symptoms), because only feelings – and not thoughts – can be really expressed nonverbally. This is a crossed relation between thought and expression;
 I feel anxious and afraid [feeling], and I try to do something about that [action]. This is a crossed relation between feeling and action – the client tries to change his feelings through voluntary action but, as expected, he is unable to.

The first step of therapy consists of creating direct relations between feelings and expressions, and between thoughts and actions:
 I feel insecure [feeling], and that's why I can't go to college [expression]. The client interprets his inability to go to college as an emotional expression of his insecurity. This is a direct relation between feeling and expression;
 I plan to go to college [thought], and I try to do something about that [action], because I cannot simply command myself not to be afraid anymore (by means of rational decision). This is a direct relation between thought and action.

In the second step of therapy, the natural result of establishing direct relations is that the problem ceases to exist:
 I plan to go to college [thought], and I try to take concrete steps in that direction [action];
 I don't feel so anxious and afraid [the unwanted feeling is gone], and I feel I can go to college [the unwanted emotional expression is gone]. When I'm afraid about it [accepted feeling], I express my fears [accepted emotional expression].

Group interventions
Relational therapy can be applied in families, organizations, and classrooms to change crossed relations and thus increase performance and satisfaction in work and learning.
For example, confronted with a poor homework of a student, a teacher may think that by doing the homework that way, the student wants to defy him. If that is true, the problem is with the student – she tends to express her feelings indirectly, through her actions (feeling-action crossed intrapersonal relation). If that is not true, and the student was just lazy or incompetent, the problem is with the teacher – he tends to take personally and process emotionally the acts of others (action-feeling crossed interpersonal relation). Whatever the source of the problem, relations counselor uses both individual and couple interventions, based on drawing a relational matrix of the group, which shows crossed relations. If, for some reason, one of the partners could not be changed, the other may be taught to compensate his crossed (distorted) relation through another crossed relation, the result being an accurate communication at both rational and emotional levels. For example, if one of the partners is busy and does not have time to spend with the other, but does not dare to tell her that, and instead expresses that through his body language, the other learns to interpret this body language not as emotional indifference (what it seems to be), but as a sign of busyness (what it actually is), and thus she will not be hurt anymore.

Evaluation
Karl Jaspers criticized the hypostatic method as used in the study of personality, arguing that:

Some presentations of the hypostatic model have been criticized for containing too many neologisms that make it difficult to understand, and for being "doomed to be incomplete".

The model was praised for being "original" and "provocative", and for inaugurating the field of "concrete-systemic" or "hypostatic" psychology. It alludes to understanding the effects of illicit substances and disease, as well as the underlying change in personality which likely ensues in relation. It shows that personality is believed to be static and relatively in-changeable, whereas ideology is more dynamic than personality. The model was cited as one of the reference sources on the subjects of self, character, and personality.

See also

Cognitive-affective personality system
Constructivist epistemology
Contextualism
Personality systematics
Perspectivism
Postmodernism
Relationalism
Second-order cybernetics
Social neuroscience
Systems psychology

Notes

References
Berne, Eric (1979). Transactional Analysis. Ballantine Books. .
Carter, Rita (2008). Multiplicity: The New Science of Personality, Identity, and the Self. Little Brown and Company. .
Fall, Kevin A., Miner Holden, Janice, Marquis, Andre (2004). Theoretical Models of Counseling and Psychotherapy. Brunner-Routledge. .
James, William (2001). Psychology: The Briefer Course. Dover. .
Minsky, Marvin (1985). The society of mind. Simon & Schuster. .
Rodriguez, Tessie J. (2009). Understanding Human Behavior. Rex Bookstore Inc. .
Rowan, John (1990). Subpersonalities: The People Inside Us. Routledge .
Schwartz, Richard C. (1997). Internal Family Systems Therapy. Guilford Press. .
Starkey, William J. (2011). Cupid's Code: The Psychology of Relationships, Seduction, Marriage & Love. Morning Star Resources. .
Tapu, Codrin Stefan (2001). Hypostatic Personality: Psychopathology of Doing and Being Made. Premier. .
Tapu, Codrin Stefan (2011). Guide to Relational Therapy''. CAdPsy. .

External links
Dialogical self theory 
Hypostatic relationality
Relational being 
Relational therapy
Subpersonalities
The singular self

Personality theories
Psychological models